(born August 30, 1972 in Tokyo) is a Japanese baseball outfielder who won a silver medal in the 1996 Summer Olympics.

External links
 
 

1972 births
Living people
Asian Games bronze medalists for Japan
Asian Games medalists in baseball
Asian Games silver medalists for Japan
Baseball players at the 1996 Summer Olympics
Baseball players at the 2006 Asian Games
Baseball players at the 2010 Asian Games
Medalists at the 1996 Summer Olympics
Medalists at the 2006 Asian Games
Medalists at the 2010 Asian Games
Olympic baseball players of Japan
Olympic medalists in baseball
Olympic silver medalists for Japan